The term Diocese of Puerto Rico may refer to:
 the Roman Catholic Archdiocese of San Juan de Puerto Rico
 the Anglican Episcopal Diocese of Puerto Rico